Boris Grigorevich Kolker (born July 15, 1939, in Tiraspol, Moldavian ASSR, Soviet Union) is a language teacher, translator and advocate of the international language Esperanto. He was until 1993 a Soviet and Russian citizen and since then has been a resident and citizen of the United States residing in Cleveland, Ohio. In 1985 he was awarded a Ph.D. in linguistics from the Institute of Linguistics of the Academy of Sciences of the USSR in Moscow.

Biography

Dr. Kolker learned Esperanto in 1957 and is the author of articles on interlinguistics, book reviews and three famous Esperanto textbooks for students of different levels. Due to the great popularity of his book :eo:Vojaĝo en Esperanto-lando (Travels in Esperanto-Land), which is both a proficiency course in Esperanto and a guidebook to Esperanto culture, he is known to many as a guide to Esperanto-Land.

Kolker is a member of the Academy of Esperanto, an honorary member of the World Esperanto Association (Universala Esperanto Asocio), and an associate editor of the monthly magazine Monato. For two decades he headed a large-scale Esperanto correspondence course in Russia that graduated around 900 students. He also taught Esperanto at American universities in San Francisco and Hartford.

Currently he runs the International Proficiency Correspondence Esperanto Course and is also Vice President of the International Examination Board for the International League of Esperanto Instructors (ILEI). At various times he was steering committee member of the World Esperanto Association (Universala Esperanto Asocio), co-founder and co-leader of nationwide Esperanto organizations in the Soviet Union and Russia. He has lectured and spoken publicly at several World Congresses of Esperanto and in 2000 he directed the theme of the 85th World Congress of Esperanto in Tel-Aviv.

References

External links

Doctoral thesis 

 Вклад русского языка в формирование и развитие эсперанто (The contribution of the Russian language to the emergence and development of Esperanto). - Moscow: USSR Academy of Sciences, Linguistic Institute, 1985. - 23 p. Synopsis of doctoral thesis in Russian language.

Textbooks 

 Vojaĝo en Esperanto-lando. Perfektiga kurso de Esperanto kaj Gvidlibro pri la Esperanto-kulturo.  (Travels in Esperanto-Land. Proficiency Course in Esperanto and a Guidebook to Esperanto Culture).
 Lernolibro de la lingvo Esperanto. Baza kurso.. (Esperanto textbook. Elementary course.)
 Esperanto en 16 tagoj. Ekspres-kurso.  (Esperanto in 16 days. Express-course.)
 Internacia lingvo Esperanto. Plena lernolibro. (International language Esperanto. Complete textbook.)

1939 births
Living people
People from Tiraspol
Moldovan Jews
Esperanto speaking Jews
American people of Moldovan-Jewish descent
Akademio de Esperanto members
Russian Esperantists
American Esperantists
People from Cleveland